Juggernaut is a 1974 British crime suspense film starring Richard Harris, Omar Sharif, and Anthony Hopkins. The film, which was directed by Richard Lester, was largely shot on location aboard the TS Hamburg in the North Sea. It was inspired by real events aboard QE2 in May 1972 when Royal Marines and Special Boat Service personnel parachuted onto the ship because of a bomb hoax.

In the film, Richard Harris leads a team of Naval bomb disposal experts sent to disarm several large barrel bombs that have been placed aboard an ocean liner crossing the North Atlantic. Meanwhile, ashore, the police race against time to track down the mysterious bomb maker, who calls himself "Juggernaut", who will agree to a ransom in order to reveal the information that will disarm the bombs.

Plot
The ocean liner SS Britannic is in the middle of a voyage in the North Atlantic with 1200 passengers on board when the shipping line's owner Nicholas Porter in London receives a telephone call from an unidentified person with an Irish accent styling himself as "Juggernaut", who claims to have placed seven drums of high explosives aboard the ship which are timed to explode and sink it at dawn on the following day. He warns that the drums are booby-trapped in various ways and that any attempt to move them will result in detonation, and offers that technical instructions in how to render the bombs safe will be given in exchange for a ransom of £500,000. As an indication of his seriousness he then sets off a demonstration attack with a series of small bombs behind the ships funnel, which injure one crewman. Unable to order an evacuation of the ship's passengers via lifeboats due to rough seas, the shipping line's management is inclined to yield to the ransom demand, however British government officials inform the company that if it does so they will withdraw the company's operating subsidy in line with the Government's policy of non-appeasement of terrorism.

Instead, a Royal Navy officer, Lt. Cmdr. Anthony Fallon, leading a bomb-disposal unit, is dispatched, arriving on the scene by air transit and parachuting into the sea, to board the ship and defuse the barrel-bombs before the deadline. Meanwhile, back in London, Supt. McCleod, whose wife and two children happen to be holidaying on board the ship, leads Scotland Yard's investigation against the clock to capture the criminal master-bomber.

After an attempt to drill a hole into one of the barrel-bombs fails, setting it off and damaging the ship, Fallon decides to split up his team with each man working simultaneously on each of the remaining devices at different points around the ship, Fallon going first with each stage of the defusing operation and informing his men of each move by radio link, with the aim that if he fails and his bomb explodes, his men will know what went wrong and continue the process onwards, with his second in command taking up the lead, until the devices are disarmed. However, if two more bombs go off, the ship will sink. Fallon proceeds to disarm the bomb he is working on, apparently successfully, with his men following each step. However, it contains a hidden secondary mechanism and one of his men, close friend Charlie Braddock, accidentally triggers it, resulting in his death when it explodes, causing further damage to the ship. A distraught Fallon abandons the operation and tells the ship's captain, Alex Brunel, to advise the shipping line to pay the ransom to avoid any more carnage. However, when negotiations with Juggernaut break down (in part because Juggernaut sees the trap police set for him when he goes to collect the ransom) Fallon is ordered by the captain to continue disarming the remaining bombs.

Meanwhile, an extensive police search back in London captures the bomber posing as Juggernaut, who is revealed to be an embittered former British military bomb-disposal officer, Sidney Buckland. When told of the news, Fallon, still working on disabling the bombs, reveals that Buckland had trained him and once saved his life, and insists that Buckland be put in contact with him. Buckland/Juggernaut is escorted to the police situation room. By this time Fallon has worked out the important details of the bombs, but has no way of knowing which of two options (cutting a red or blue wire) will disable the bombs, and if he chooses the wrong one it will detonate them. Time is running out and dawn is fast approaching. Fallon and Juggernaut have a brief conversation, and, because of their former comradeship, Juggernaut agrees to tell Fallon how to safely disarm the bombs. Juggernaut gives the instruction to ‘cut the blue wire’ over audio. After a silence, Juggernaut repeats the instruction more fervently. Fallon, sensing he is being lied to, does the opposite of what he is told, cutting the red wire instead, and in so doing is successful in disabling the bomb. The rest of the bomb-disposal unit swiftly follow Fallon's example, and the ship and its passengers are saved.

Cast

 Richard Harris as Lieutenant Commander Anthony Fallon
 Omar Sharif as Captain Alex Brunel
 David Hemmings as Charlie Braddock
 Anthony Hopkins as Superintendent John McLeod
 Shirley Knight as Barbara Bannister
 Ian Holm as Nicholas Porter
 Clifton James as Corrigan
 Roy Kinnear as Ship's Social Director Curtain
 Caroline Mortimer as Susan McLeod
 Mark Burns as Hollingsworth
 John Stride as Hughes
 Freddie Jones as Sidney Buckland
 Julian Glover as Commander Marder
 Cyril Cusack as O'Neil (uncredited)
 Michael Hordern as Baker (uncredited)
 Jack Watson as Chief Engineer Mallicent
 Roshan Seth as Azad
 Kenneth Colley as Detective Brown
 Kenneth Cope as Bridgeman
 John Bindon as Driscoll
 Ben Aris as The Walker
 Tom Chadbon as Juggernaut's contact
 Gareth Thomas as Liverpool Joiner
 Simon MacCorkindale as No.1 helmsman
 Andrew Bradford as Jim Hardy, 3rd Officer
 Paul Antrim as Digby
 Adam Bridges as David McCleod
 Rebecca Bridge as Nancy McCleod
 Michael Egan as Mr Fowlers
 Freddie Fletcher as 2nd Radio Officer
 Terence Hillyer as Menzies
 Barnaby Holm as Christopher Porter
 Kristine Howarth as Mrs Buckland
 Victor Lucas as detective
 Paul Luty as clerk
 David Purcell as 1st detective
 Eric Mason as 2nd detective
 Michael Melia as navigator
 Doris Nolan as Mrs Corrigan
 Liza Ross as Laura Kellogg
 Bob Sessions as Jerry Kellogg
 Colin Thatcher as Henning
 Ivy Moy-Loader as an extra

Production

Development
Richard Alan Simmons' script was inspired by a real life bomb threat against the Queen Elizabeth 2 in 1972, which resulted in Special forces (one SAS, two from the Special Boat Squadron and a Welsh bomb disposal expert of the Royal Army Ordnance Corps) being parachuted into the Atlantic to board and search the liner, as dramatized in the film.

The film was the second in what was meant to be a 13-film slate produced by David V. Picker after he resigned as head of production for United Artists (the first was Lenny). It was made by his company, Two Roads. United Artists would distribute. In November 1973 it was announced Bryan Forbes was to direct, with Simmons producing and Richard Harris to star, with the film going to start in January 1974.

Bryan Forbes left the project, however, as did his replacement, Don Taylor. Picker then turned to Richard Lester, with whom he had made a number of films at United Artists, notably A Hard Day's Night. Lester was finishing work on the Musketeers films in Spain when he got a call from Denis O'Dell saying "We just fired our second director and I've got a Russian ship and we've got to leave on 18 February. Will you take it on?"

On taking over the film, Lester completely rewrote the script with writer Alan Plater. Omar Sharif, Richard Harris and David Hemmings were already cast; Lester cast the rest. He wound up filming three weeks after his original call.

"I think if I'd sat carefully and thought about it I wouldn't have done it," said Lester later. "It was very exciting. And I think that energy of getting it right carried it through. It was a wonderful experience, great fun."

The film's writer/producer, Richard Alan Simmons, was so unhappy with the reworked script that he had himself credited as Richard DeKoker on the finished film.

Filming
Filming took place in March and April 1974.

The film was shot mainly aboard the real cruise ship TS Hamburg. The German vessel had recently been sold to the Soviet Black Sea Shipping Company and renamed TS Maxim Gorkiy. Before the Soviets began operating the ship for paying passengers, the British production company chartered the ship.

Advertisements were run in British papers, soliciting extras who would take a lengthy cruise in the North Sea for free, but with the knowledge that the ship would actually seek out the worst possible weather, as the story demanded seas too rough for the lifeboats to be lowered, trapping the passengers on board. They received 2,500 applicants and had to select 250. Weather was bad; Ian Holm did not go on location but says he heard "reports of horrible storms off Iceland and everybody getting drunk to deal with it. The story was the bar closed only between seven and seven-thirty in the morning."

The ship's charter was negotiated at a set rate in February 1974, while oil prices were continuously skyrocketing due to the still-ongoing 1973 oil crisis. As a result, the Soviets, who paid the vessel's operating costs during filming, ended up losing money on the deal.

Lester says the film was scheduled for ten weeks and completed in six.

Some interior filming was completed on stages at Pinewood Studios. Location shooting was also done in and around London. A room at St Thomas' Hospital in Lambeth overlooking the River Thames doubled as the office of the Managing Director of the shipping line.

The movie marked the film debut of Simon MacCorkindale.

Reception

Critical reception
The New York Times called it "a movie without any style and without any characters." Stanley Kauffmann of The New Republic wrote- 'Juggernaut missed the boat, but its editing and photography were in themselves thrilling'. Pauline Kael said: "The only disaster picture that has redeemed the genre is Richard Lester’s 'Juggernaut,' which kidded the threadbare pants off the same clichés that the other pictures still try to make work."

Juggernaut holds an 83% rating on Rotten Tomatoes based on six reviews.

Box Office
Lester thought the film was hurt by the fact people thought it was a disaster movie when "that wasn't what it was at all."

Home media
The 2005 UK DVD release used the alternate title Terror on the Britannic. The film was released on Blu Ray by Kino Lorber on 9 September 2014.

References

Notes

External links
 
 

1974 films
1970s crime thriller films
1970s disaster films
British crime thriller films
British disaster films
Films directed by Richard Lester
Films set in London
Films set in the Atlantic Ocean
Films set on ships
Films shot at Pinewood Studios
Seafaring films
United Artists films
Films scored by Ken Thorne
1970s English-language films
1970s British films